The Church of St. Catherine of Siena is a Roman Catholic parish church in the Roman Catholic Archdiocese of New York, located at 411 East 68th Street, Manhattan, New York City. The parish was developed from that of St. Vincent Ferrer in 1896. It is staffed by the Dominican Fathers.

The church built a two-story convent and penthouse at 416 East 69th Street, built 1957 to designs by Starrett & Van Vleck of 267 Fifth Avenue for $100,000 ($ in current dollar terms).

On May 8, 2015, the Archdiocese of New York announced the merger of parishes between St Vincent Ferrer and St. Catherine of Siena Church. Both churches remain open.

References 

Roman Catholic churches completed in 1957
Religious organizations established in 1897
Roman Catholic churches in Manhattan
Upper East Side
20th-century Roman Catholic church buildings in the United States